Burlyayevka is a rural locality (a selo) in Pykhovksoye Rural Settlement, Novokhopyorsky District, Voronezh Oblast, Russia. The population was 351 as of 2010. There are 5 streets.

Geography 
Burlyayevka is located 28 km southwest of Novokhopyorsk (the district's administrative centre) by road. Vladimirovka is the nearest rural locality.

References 

Populated places in Novokhopyorsky District